This is an incomplete list of Acts of the Parliament of the United Kingdom for the years 1920–1939.  Note that the first parliament of the United Kingdom was held in 1801; parliaments between 1707 and 1800 were either parliaments of Great Britain or of Ireland).  For Acts passed up until 1707 see List of Acts of the Parliament of England and List of Acts of the Parliament of Scotland.  For Acts passed from 1707 to 1800 see List of Acts of the Parliament of Great Britain.  See also the List of Acts of the Parliament of Ireland.

For Acts of the devolved parliaments and assemblies in the United Kingdom, see the List of Acts of the Scottish Parliament, the List of Acts of the Northern Ireland Assembly, and the List of Acts and Measures of the National Assembly for Wales; see also the List of Acts of the Parliament of Northern Ireland.

The number shown after each Act's title is its chapter number. Acts passed before 1963 are cited using this number, preceded by the year(s) of the reign during which the relevant parliamentary session was held; thus the Union with Ireland Act 1800 is cited as "39 & 40 Geo. 3 c. 67", meaning the 67th Act passed during the session that started in the 39th year of the reign of George III and which finished in the 40th year of that reign.  Note that the modern convention is to use Arabic numerals in citations (thus "41 Geo. 3" rather than "41 Geo. III"). Acts of the last session of the Parliament of Great Britain and the first session of the Parliament of the United Kingdom are both cited as "41 Geo. 3".  Acts passed from 1963 onwards are simply cited by calendar year and chapter number.

1920 – 1929

1920 (10 & 11 Geo. 5)

Public General Acts
 Administration of Justice Act 1920 c. 81
 Agriculture Act 1920 c. 76
 Air Navigation Act 1920 c. 80
 Appropriation Act 1920 c. 32
 Appropriation (No. 2) Act 1920 c. 59
 Army and Air Force (Annual) Act 1920 c. 7
 Bank Notes (Ireland) Act 1920 c. 24
 Blind Persons Act 1920 c. 49
 British Empire Exhibition (Guarantee) Act 1920 c. 74
 Census Act 1920 c. 41
 Census (Ireland) Act 1920 c. 42
 Coal Mines (Emergency) Act 1920 c. 4
 Coinage Act 1920 c. 3
 Consolidated Fund (No. 1) Act 1920 c. 1
 County Councils Association Expenses (Amendment) Act 1920 c. 19
 Criminal Injuries (Ireland) Act 1920 c. 66
 Dangerous Drugs Act 1920 c. 46
 Defence of the Realm (Acquisition of Land) Act 1920 c. 79
 Duchy of Lancaster Act 1920 c. 51
 Duplicands of Feu-duties (Scotland) Act 1920 c. 34
 Dyestuffs (Import Regulation) Act 1920 c. 77
 Ecclesiastical Tithe Rentcharge (Rates) Act 1920 c. 22
 Ejection (Suspensory) (Scotland) Act 1920 c. 11
 Emergency Powers Act 1920 c. 55
 Employment of Women, Young Persons, and Children Act 1920 c. 65
 Expiring Laws Continuance Act 1920 c. 73
 Fertilisers (Temporary Control of Export) Act 1920 c. 44
 Finance Act 1920 c. 18
 Firearms Act 1920 c. 43
 Gas Regulation Act 1920 c. 28
 Gold and Silver (Export Control, etc.) Act 1920 c. 70
 Government of Ireland Act 1920 c. 67
 Harbours Docks & Piers (Temporary Increase of Charges) Act 1920 c. 21
 House-Letting and Rating Suspensory (Scotland) Act 1920 c. 8
 Housing (Scotland) Act 1920 c. 71
 Imperial War Museum Act 1920 c. 16
 Increase of Rent and Mortgage Interest (Restrictions) Act 1920 c. 17
 Indemnity Act 1920 c. 48
 Isle of Man (Customs) Act 1920 c. 60
 Juries (Emergency Provisions) Act 1920 c. 78
 Jurors (Enrolment of Women) (Scotland) Act 1920 c. 53
 Juvenile Courts (Metropolis) Act 1920 c. 68
 Maintenance Orders (Facilities for Enforcement) Act 1920 c. 33
 Married Women (Maintenance) Act 1920 c. 63
 Married Women’s Property (Scotland) Act 1920 c. 64
 Merchant Shipping (Amendment) Act 1920 c. 2
 Merchant Shipping (Scottish Fishing Boats) Act 1920 c. 39
 Mining Industry Act 1920 c. 50
 Ministry of Food (Continuance) Act 1920 c. 47
 National Health Insurance Act 1920 c. 10
 Nauru Island Agreement Act 1920 c. 27
 Official Secrets Act 1920 c. 75
 Overseas Trade (Credits and Insurance) Act 1920 c. 29
 Pensions (Increase) Act 1920 c. 36
 Places of Worship (Enfranchisement) Act 1920 c. 56
 Post Office and Telegraph Act 1920 c. 40
 Profiteering (Amendment) Act 1920 c. 13
 Public Libraries (Ireland) Act 1920 c. 25
 Public Libraries (Scotland) Act 1920 c. 45
 Public Utility Companies (Capital Issues) Act 1920 c. 9
 Public Works Loans Act 1920 c. 61
 Ready Money Football Betting Act 1920 c. 52
 Registrar General (Scotland) Act 1920 c. 69
 Representation of the People Act 1920 c. 15
 Representation of the People (No. 2) Act 1920 c. 35
 Resident Magistrates (Ireland) Act 1920 c. 38
 Restoration of Order in Ireland Act 1920 c. 31
 Roads Act 1920 c. 72
 Savings Banks Act 1920 c. 12
 Seeds Act 1920 c. 54
 Shops (Early Closing) Act 1920 c. 58
 Sheriffs (Ireland) Act 1920 c. 26
 Telegraph (Money) Act 1920 c. 37
 Tramways (Temporary Increase of Charges) Act 1920 c. 14
 Treaties of Peace (Austria and Bulgaria) Act 1920 c. 6
 Unemployment Insurance Act 1920 c. 30
 Unemployment Insurance (Temporary Provisions Amendment) Act 1920 c. 82
 Unemployment (Relief Works) Act 1920 c. 57
 Veterinary Surgeons Act (1881) Amendment Act 1920 c. 20
 War Emergency Laws (Continuance) Act 1920 c. 5
 War Pensions Act 1920 c. 23
 Women and Young Persons (Employment in Lead Processes) Act 1920 c. 62

Local Acts
 Mayor's and City of London Court Act 1920 c. cxxxiv

1921 (11 & 12 Geo. 5)

 Admiralty Pensions Act 1921 c. 39
 Agriculture (Amendment) Act 1921 c. 17
 Appropriation Act 1921 c. 46
 Appropriation (No. 2) Act 1921 c. 63
 Army and Air Force (Annual) Act 1921 c. 9
 Captive Birds Shooting (Prohibition) Act 1921 c. 13
 Children Act 1921 c. 4
 Church of Scotland Act 1921 c. 29
 Coal Mines (Decontrol) Act 1921 c. 6
 Consolidated Fund (No. 1) Act 1921 c. 2
 Consolidated Fund (No. 2) Act 1921 c. 3
 Corn Production Acts (Repeal) Act 1921 c. 48
 Corn Sales Act 1921 c. 35
 Coroners Act 1921 c. 30
 Criminal Procedure (Scotland) Act 1921 c. 50
 Deceased Brother's Widow's Marriage Act 1921 c. 24
 Dentists Act 1921 c. 21
 Duchy of Lancaster (Application of Capital Moneys) Act 1921 c. 45
 Education Act 1921 c. 51
 Exchequer and Audit Departments Act 1921 c. 52
 Expiring Laws Continuance Act 1921 c. 53
 Finance Act 1921 c. 32
 Forestry Act 1921 c. 61
 German Reparation (Recovery) Act 1921 c. 5
 Greenwich Hospital Act 1921 c. 41
 Health Resorts and Watering Places Act 1921 c. 27
 Housing Act 1921 c. 19
 Housing (Scotland) Act 1921 c. 33
 Importation of Plumage (Prohibition) Act 1921 c. 16
 Indian Divorces (Validity) Act 1921 c. 18
 Irish Railways (Settlement of Claims) Act 1921 c. 59
 Isle of Man (Customs) Act 1921 c. 40
 Juries (Emergency Provisions) (Renewal) Act 1921 c. 36
 Land Settlement Amendment Act 1921 c. 43
 Licensing Act 1921 c. 42
 Local Authorities (Financial Provisions) Act 1921 c. 67
 Merchant Shipping Act 1921 c. 28
 Ministries of Munitions and Shipping (Cessation) Act 1921 c. 8
 Mr. Speaker's Retirement Act 1921 c. 10
 National Health Insurance Act 1921 c. 25
 National Health Insurance (Prolongation of Insurance) Act 1921 c. 66
 Overseas Trade (Credits and Insurance) Amendment Act 1921 c. 26
 Police Pensions Act 1921 c. 31
 Poor Law Emergency Provisions (Scotland) Act 1921 c. 64
 Protection of Animals Act, (1911) Amendment Act 1921 c. 14
 Protection of Animals (Scotland) Act 1912 Amendment Act 1921 c. 22
 Public Health (Officers) Act 1921 c. 23
 Public Health (Tuberculosis) Act 1921 c. 12
 Public Works Loans Act 1921 c. 54
 Railways Act 1921 c. 55
 Representation of the People Act 1921 c. 34
 Safeguarding of Industries Act 1921 c. 47
 Salmon and Freshwater Fisheries Act 1921 c. 38
 Shops (Early Closing) Act (1920) Amendment Act 1921 c. 60
 Supreme Court Officers (Retirement, Pensions, &c.) Act 1921 c. 56
 Telegraph (Money) Act 1921 c. 57
 Territorial Army and Militia Act 1921 c. 37
 Tithe Annuities Apportionment Act 1921 c. 20
 Trade Facilities Act 1921 c. 65
 Treaty of Peace (Hungary) Act 1921 c. 11
 Tribunals of Inquiry (Evidence) Act 1921 c. 7
 Trusts (Scotland) Act 1921 c. 58
 Unemployed Workers’ Dependants (Temporary Provision) Act 1921 c. 62
 Unemployment Insurance Act 1921 c. 1
 Unemployment Insurance (No. 2) Act 1921 c. 15
 War Pensions Act 1921 c. 49
 Water Undertakings (Modification of Charges) Act 1921 c. 44

1922

12 & 13 Geo. 5

 Air Ministry (Kenley Common Acquisition) Act 1922 c. 40
 Allotments Act 1922 c. 51
 Allotments (Scotland) Act 1922 c. 52
 Anglo-Persian Oil Company (Payment of Calls) Act 1922 c. 26
 Appropriation Act 1922 c. 32
 Army and Air Force (Annual) Act 1922 c. 6
 Audit (Local Authorities, &c.) Act 1922 c. 14
 Bread Acts Amendment Act 1922 c. 28
 British Empire Exhibition (Amendment) Act 1922 c. 25
 British Nationality and Status of Aliens Act 1922 c. 44
 Canals (Continuance of Charging Powers) Act 1922 c. 27
 Celluloid and Cinematograph Film Act 1922 c. 35
 Consolidated Fund (No. 1) Act 1922 c. 1
 Consolidated Fund (No. 2) Act 1922 c. 3
 Constabulary (Ireland) Act 1922 c. 55
 Coroners (Emergency Provisions Continuance) Act 1922 c. 2
 Criminal Law Amendment Act 1922 c. 56
 Diseases of Animals Act 1922 c. 8
 East India Loans (Railways and Irrigation) Act 1922 c. 9
 Ecclesiastical Tithe Rentcharges (Rates) Act 1922 c. 58
 Education (Scotland) (Superannuation) Act 1922 c. 48
 Electricity (Supply) Act 1922 c. 46
 Empire Settlement Act 1922 c. 13
 Expiring Laws Act 1922 c. 50
 Finance Act 1922 c. 17
 Gaming Act 1922 c. 19
 Government of Northern Ireland (Loan Guarantee) Act 1922 c. 24
 Government of the Soudan Loan (Amendment) Act 1922 c. 15
 Harbours, Docks, and Piers (Temporary Increase of Charges) Act 1922 c. 23
 Indian High Courts Act 1922 c. 20
 Infanticide Act 1922 c. 18
 Irish Free State (Agreement) Act 1922 c. 4
 Isle of Man (Customs) Act 1922 c. 36
 Juries Act 1922 c. 11
 Kenya Divorces (Validity) Act 1922 c. 10
 Law of Property Act 1922 c. 16
 Local Government and other Officers' Superannuation Act 1922 c. 59
 Lunacy Act 1922 c. 60
 Milk and Dairies (Amendment) Act 1922 c. 54
 National Health Insurance Act 1922 c. 38
 Naval Discipline Act 1922 c. 37
 Oil in Navigable Waters Act 1922 c. 39
 Pawnbrokers Act 1922 c. 5
 Post Office (Parcels) Act 1922 c. 49
 Post Office (Pneumatic Tubes Acquisition) Act 1922 c. 43
 Public Works Loans Act 1922 c. 33
 Railway and Canal Commission (Consents) Act 1922 c. 47
 Representation of the People Act 1922 c. 12
 Representation of the People (No. 2) Act 1922 c. 41
 Sale of Tea Act 1922 c. 29
 School Teachers (Superannuation) Act 1922 c. 42
 Solicitors Act 1922 c. 57
 Summer Time Act 1922 c. 22
 Telegraph (Money) Act 1922 c. 45
 Treaties of Washington Act 1922 c. 21
 Unemployment Insurance Act 1922 c. 7
 Unemployment Insurance (No. 2) Act 1922 c. 30
 Universities (Scotland) Act 1922 c. 31
 War Service Canteens (Disposal of Surplus) Act 1922 c. 53
 Whale Fisheries (Scotland) (Amendment) Act 1922 c. 34

13 Geo. 5 Sess. 2
 Appropriation Act 1922 (Session 2) c. 3
 Importation of Animals Act 1922 (Session 2) c. 5
 Irish Free State (Consequential Provisions) Act 1922 (Session 2) c. 2 
 Irish Free State Constitution Act 1922 (Session 2) c. 1
 Trade Facilities and Loans Guarantee Act 1922 (Session 2) c. 4

1923 (13 & 14 Geo. 5)

 Agricultural Credits Act 1923 c. 34
 Agricultural Holdings Act 1923 c. 9
 Agricultural Holdings (Scotland) Act 1923 c. 10
 Agricultural Rates Act 1923 c. 39
 Agriculture (Amendment) Act 1923 c. 25
 Alderney (Transfer of Property, &c.) Act 1923 c. 15
 Appropriation Act 1923 c. 35
 Army and Air Force (Annual) Act 1923 c. 3
 Bastardy Act 1923 c. 23
 Consolidated Fund (No. 1) Act 1923 c. 1
 Cotton Industry Act 1923 c. 22
 Dangerous Drugs and Poisons (Amendment) Act 1923 c. 5
 Dentists Act 1923 c. 36
 East India Loans Act 1923 c. 31
 Education (Institution Children) Act 1923 c. 38
 Expiring Laws Continuance Act 1923 c. 37
 Explosives Act 1923 c. 17
 Fees (Increase) Act 1923 c. 4
 Finance Act 1923 c. 14
 Forestry (Transfer of Woods) Act 1923 c. 21
 Housing, &c. Act 1923 c. 24
 Increase of Rent and Mortgage Interest Restrictions (Continuance) Act 1923 c. 7
 Industrial Assurance Act 1923 c. 8
 Intoxicating Liquor (Sale to Persons under Eighteen) Act 1923 c. 28
 Isle of Man (Customs) Act 1923 c. 26
 Local Authorities (Emergency Provisions) Act 1923 c. 6
 Matrimonial Causes Act 1923 c. 19
 Merchant Shipping Acts (Amendment) Act 1923 c. 40
 Mines (Working Facilities and Support) Act 1923 c. 20
 Public Works Loans Act 1923 c. 29
 Railway Fires Act (1905) Amendment Act 1923 c. 27
 Railways (Authorisation of Works) Act 1923 c. 30
 Rent and Mortgage Interest Restrictions Act 1923 c. 32
 Rent Restrictions (Notices of Increase) Act 1923 c. 13
 Restoration of Order in Ireland (Indemnity) Act 1923 c. 12
 Salmon and Freshwater Fisheries Act 1923 c. 16
 Special Constables Act 1923 c. 11
 Town Councils (Scotland) Act 1923 c. 41
 Unemployment Insurance Act 1923 c. 2
 Universities of Oxford and Cambridge Act 1923 c. 33
 War Memorials (Local Authorities' Powers) Act 1923 c. 18
 Workmen's Compensation Act 1923 c. 42

1924

14 & 15 Geo. 5

 Agricultural Wages (Regulation) Act 1924 c. 37
 Appropriation Act 1924 c. 31
 Arbitration Clauses (Protocol) Act 1924 c. 39
 Army and Air Force (Annual) Act 1924 c. 5
 Auxiliary Air Force and Air Force Reserve Act 1924 c. 15
 British Museum Act 1924 c. 23
 Carriage of Goods by Sea Act 1924 c. 22
 Consolidated Fund (No. 1) Act 1924 c. 2
 Consolidated Fund (No. 2) Act 1924 c. 4
 Conveyancing (Scotland) Act 1924 c. 27
 County Courts Act 1924 c. 17
 Diseases of Animals Act 1924 c. 3
 Education (Scotland) (Superannuation) Act 1924 c. 13
 Finance Act 1924 c. 21
 Friendly Societies Act 1924 c. 11
 Government of India (Leave of Absence) Act 1924 c. 28
 Housing (Financial Provisions) Act 1924 c. 35
 Irish Free State (Confirmation of Agreement) Act 1924 c. 41
 Isle of Man (Customs) Act 1924 c. 24
 Local Authorities (Emergency Provisions) Act 1924 c. 29
 Local Authorities Loans (Scotland) Act 1924 c. 36
 London Traffic Act 1924 c. 34
 Marriages Validity (Provisional Orders) Act 1924 c. 20
 National Health Insurance Act 1924 c. 38
 National Health Insurance (Cost of Medical Benefit) Act 1924 c. 10
 Old Age Pensions Act 1924 c. 33
 Pacific Cable Act 1924 c. 19
 Pensions (Increase) Act 1924 c. 32
 Poor Law Emergency Provisions Continuance (Scotland) Act 1924 c. 9
 Prevention of Eviction Act 1924 c. 18
 Public Works Loans Act 1924 c. 26
 School Teachers (Superannuation) Act 1924 c. 12
 Small Debt (Scotland) Act 1924 c. 16
 Telegraph (Money) Act 1924 c. 25
 Trade Facilities Act 1924 c. 8
 Treaty of Peace (Turkey) Act 1924 c. 7
 Unemployment Insurance Act 1924 c. 1
 Unemployment Insurance (No. 2) Act 1924 c. 30
 Unemployment Insurance (No. 3) Act 1924 c. 6
 West Indian Islands (Telegraph) Act 1924 c. 14
 Workmen's Compensation (Silicosis) Act 1924 c. 40

15 & 16 Geo. 5
 Canals (Continuance of Charging Powers) Act 1924 c. 2
 Expiring Laws Continuance Act 1924 c. 1
 Irish Free State Land Purchase (Loan Guarantee) Act 1924 c. 3
 Law of Property Act (Postponement) Act 1924 c. 4
 Law of Property (Amendment) Act 1924 c. 5

1925 (15 & 16 Geo. 5)

Public General Acts 

 Administration of Estates Act 1925 c. 23
 Administration of Justice Act 1925 c. 28
 Advertisements Regulation Act 1925 c. 52
 Agricultural Rates (Additional Grant) Continuance Act 1925 c. 10
 Agricultural Returns Act 1925 c. 39
 Allotments Act 1925 c. 61
 Anglo-Italian Treaty (East African Territories) Act 1925 c. 9
 Appropriation Act 1925 c. 57
 Appropriation (No. 2) Act 1925 c. 78
 Army and Air Force (Annual) Act 1925 c. 25
 Borough Councillors (Alteration of Number) Act 1925 c. 11
 British Empire Exhibition (Guarantee) Act 1925 c. 26
 British Sugar (Subsidy) Act 1925 c. 12
 Charitable Trusts Act 1925 c. 27
 China Indemnity (Application) Act 1925 c. 41
 Church of Scotland (Property and Endowments) Act 1925 c. 33
 Circuit Courts and Criminal Procedure (Scotland) Act 1925 c. 81
 Coastguard Act 1925 c. 88
 Consolidated Fund (No. 1) Act 1925 c. 8
 Criminal Justice Act 1925 c. 86
 Dangerous Drugs Act 1925 c. 74
 Diseases of Animals Act 1925 c. 63
 Dramatic and Musical Performers' Protection Act 1925 c. 46
 Education (Scotland) (Superannuation) Act 1925 c. 55
 Education (Scotland) Act 1925 c. 89
 Expiring Laws Act 1925 c. 76
 Finance Act 1925 c. 36
 Fire Brigade Pensions Act 1925 c. 47
 Former Enemy Aliens (Disabilities Removal) Act 1925 c. 43
 Gold Standard Act 1925 c. 29
 Government of India (Civil Services) Act 1925 c. 83
 Greenwich Hospital (Disused Burial Ground) Act 1925 c. 58
 Guardianship of Infants Act 1925 c. 45
 Honours (Prevention of Abuses) Act 1925 c. 72
 Housing Act 1925 c. 14
 Housing (Scotland) Act 1925 c. 15
 Importation of Pedigree Animals Act 1925 c. 30
 Improvement of Land Act (1899) Amendment Act 1925 c. 48
 Ireland (Confirmation of Agreement) Act 1925 c. 77
 Isle of Man (Customs) Act 1925 c. 56
 Land Charges Act 1925 c. 22
 Land Registration Act 1925 c. 21
 Land Settlement (Facilities) Amendment Act 1925 c. 85
 Law of Property Act 1925 c. 20
 Mental Deficiency (Amendment) Act 1925 c. 53
 Merchant Shipping (Equivalent Provisions) Act 1925 c. 37
 Merchant Shipping (International Labour Conventions) Act 1925 c. 42
 Mines (Working Facilities and Support) Act 1925 c. 91
 Mining Industry (Welfare Fund) Act 1925 c. 80
 Ministers of Religion (Removal of Disqualifications) Act 1925 c. 54
 National Library of Scotland Act 1925 c. 73
 Northern Ireland Land Act 1925 c. 34
 Performing Animals (Regulation) Act 1925 c. 38
 Poor Law Emergency Provisions Continuance (Scotland) Act 1925 c. 35
 Protection of Birds Act 1925 c. 31
 Public Health Act 1925 c. 71
 Public Health (Scotland) Amendment Act 1925 c. 75
 Public Works Loans Act 1925 c. 62
 Rating and Valuation Act 1925 c. 90
 Rent and Mortgage Interest (Restrictions Continuation) Act 1925 c. 32
 Roads and Streets in Police Burghs (Scotland) Act 1925 c. 82
 Roads Improvement Act 1925 c. 68
 Safeguarding of Industries (Customs Duties) Act 1925 c. 79
 Seeds (Amendment) Act 1925 c. 66
 Settled Land Act 1925 c. 18
 Statutory Gas Companies (Electricity Supply Powers) Act 1925 c. 44
 Summary Jurisdiction (Separation and Maintenance) Act 1925 c. 51
 Summer Time Act 1925 c. 64
 Supreme Court of Judicature (Consolidation) Act 1925 c. 49
 Teachers (Superannuation) Act 1925 c. 59
 Telegraph (Money) Act 1925 c. 65
 Theatrical Employers Registration Act 1925 c. 50
 Therapeutic Substances Act 1925 c. 60
 Tithe Act 1925 c. 87
 Town Planning Act 1925 c. 16
 Town Planning (Scotland) Act 1925 c. 17
 Trade Facilities Act 1925 c. 13
 Trustee Act 1925 c. 19
 Unemployment Insurance Act 1925 c. 69
 Universities and College Estates Act 1925 c. 24
 Valuation (Metropolis) Amendment Act 1925 c. 40
 War Charges (Validity) Act 1925 c. 6
 Widows', Orphans' and Old Age Contributory Pensions Act 1925 c. 70
 William Preston Indemnity Act 1925 c. 7
 Wireless Telegraphy (Explanation) Act 1925 c. 67
 Workmen's Compensation Act 1925 c. 84

Local Acts 
 Glasgow Boundaries Act 1925 c. cxxxi

1926 (16 & 17 Geo. 5)

Public General Acts

 Adoption of Children Act 1926 c. 29
 Allotments (Scotland) Act 1926 c. 5
 Appropriation Act 1926 c. 23
 Appropriation (No. 2) Act 1926 c. 33
 Army and Air Force (Annual) Act 1926 c. 6
 Bankruptcy (Amendment) Act 1926 c. 7
 Births and Deaths Registration Act 1926 c. 48
 Board of Guardians (Default) Act 1926 c. 20
 Burgh Registers (Scotland) Act 1926 c. 50
 Chartered Associations (Protection of Names and Uniforms) Act 1926 c. 26
 Coal Mines Act 1926 c. 17
 Consolidated Fund (No. 1) Act 1926 c. 1
 Coroners (Amendment) Act 1926 c. 59
 Criminal Appeal (Scotland) Act 1926 c. 15
 Criminal Justice (Amendment) Act 1926 c. 13
 Economy (Miscellaneous Provisions) Act 1926 c. 9
 Electricity (Supply) Act 1926 c. 51
 Execution of Diligence (Scotland) Act 1926 c. 16
 Expiring Laws Continuance Act 1926 c. 49
 Fertilisers and Feeding Stuffs Act 1926 c. 45
 Finance Act 1926 c. 22
 Heather Burning (Scotland) Act 1926 c. 30
 Home Counties (Music and Dancing) Licensing Act 1926 c. 31
 Horticultural Produce (Sales on Commission) Act 1926 c. 39
 Housing (Rural Workers) Act 1926 c. 56
 Imperial War Graves Endowment Fund Act 1926 c. 14
 Indian and Colonial Divorce Jurisdiction Act 1926 c. 40
 Industrial Assurance (Juvenile Societies) Act 1926 c. 35
 Isle of Man (Customs) Act 1926 c. 27
 Judicial Proceedings (Regulation of Reports) Act 1926 c. 61
 Land Drainage Act 1926 c. 24
 Law of Property (Amendment) Act 1926 c. 11
 Lead Paint (Protection against Poisoning) Act 1926 c. 37
 Legitimacy Act 1926 c. 60
 Local Authorities (Emergency Provisions) Act 1926 c. 10
 Local Government (County Boroughs and Adjustments) Act 1926 c. 38
 Markets and Fairs (Weighing of Cattle) Act 1926 c. 21
 Merchandise Marks Act 1926 c. 53
 Midwives and Maternity Homes Act 1926 c. 32
 Mining Industry Act 1926 c. 28
 Naval Reserve (Officers) Act 1926 c. 41
 Palestine and East Africa Loans Act 1926 c. 62
 Parks Regulation (Amendment) Act 1926 c. 36
 Penal Servitude Act 1926 c. 58
 Petroleum Act 1926 c. 25
 Police Pensions Act 1926 c. 34
 Prisons (Scotland) Act 1926 c. 57
 Public Health (Smoke Abatement) Act 1926 c. 43
 Public Works Loans Act 1926 c. 2
 Rating (Scotland) Act 1926 c. 47
 Re-election of Ministers Act (1919) Amendment Act 1926 c. 19
 Roman Catholic Relief Act 1926 c. 55
 Sale of Food (Weights and Measures) Act 1926 c. 63
 Secretaries of State Act 1926 c. 18
 Small Holdings and Allotments Act 1926 c. 52
 Supreme Court of Judicature of Northern Ireland Act 1926 c. 44
 Trade Facilities Act 1926 c. 3
 Unemployment Insurance Act 1926 c. 12
 Unemployment Insurance (Northern Ireland Agreement) Act 1926 c. 4
 University of London Act 1926 c. 46
 Weights and Measures (Amendment) Act 1926 c. 8
 Wireless Telegraphy (Blind Persons Facilities) Act 1926 c. 54
 Workmen's Compensation Act 1926 c. 42

Local Acts
 University of Reading Act 1926 c.lxxxiv

1927 (17 & 18 Geo. 5)

 Appropriation Act 1927 c. 11
 Appropriation (No. 2) Act 1927 c. 25
 Army and Air Force (Annual) Act 1927 c. 7
 Auctions (Bidding Agreements) Act 1927 c. 12
 Audit (Local Authorities) Act 1927 c. 31
 Cinematograph Films Act 1927 c. 29
 Colonial Probates (Protected States and Mandated Territories) Act 1927 c. 43
 Consolidated Fund (No. 1) Act 1927 c. 2
 Criminal Appeal (Scotland) Act 1927 c. 26
 Crown Lands Act 1927 c. 23
 Destructive Insects and Pests Act 1927 c. 32
 Diseases of Animals Act 1927 c. 13
 Expiring Laws Continuance Act 1927 c. 34
 Finance Act 1927 c. 10
 Forestry Act 1927 c. 6
 Government of India (Indian Navy) Act 1927 c. 8
 Government of India (Statutory Commission) Act 1927 c. 24
 Indian Church Act 1927 c. 40
 Isle of Man (Customs) Act 1927 c. 20
 Land Tax Commissioners Act 1927 c. 16
 Landlord and Tenant Act 1927 c. 36
 Medical and Dentists Acts Amendment Act 1927 c. 39
 Mental Deficiency Act 1927 c. 33
 Midwives and Maternity Homes (Scotland) Act 1927 c. 17
 Moneylenders Act 1927 c. 21
 Nursing Homes Registration Act 1927 c. 38
 Pacific Cable Act 1927 c. 9
 Police (Appeals) Act 1927 c. 19
 Poor Law Act 1927 c. 14
 Poor Law Emergency Provisions (Scotland) Act 1927 c. 3
 Protection of Animals (Amendment) Act 1927 c. 27
 Public Works Loans Act 1927 c. 1
 Public Works Loans (No. 2) Act 1927 c. 28
 Road Transport Lighting Act 1927 c. 37
 Royal and Parliamentary Titles Act 1927 c. 4
 Royal Naval Reserve Act 1927 c. 18
 Sale of Food and Drugs Act 1927 c. 5
 Sheriff Courts and Legal Officers (Scotland) Act 1927 c. 35
 Statute Law Revision Act 1927 c. 42
 Superannuation and other Trust Funds (Validation) Act 1927 c. 41
 Trade Disputes and Trade Unions Act 1927 c. 22
 Unemployment Insurance Act 1927 c. 30
 Workmen's Compensation (Transfer of Funds) Act 1927 c. 15

1928

18 & 19 Geo. 5

 Administration of Justice Act 1928 c. 26
 Agricultural Credits Act 1928 c. 43
 Agricultural Produce (Grading and Marking) Act 1928 c. 19
 Appropriation Act 1928 c. 18
 Army and Air Force (Annual) Act 1928 c. 7
 Bankers (Northern Ireland) Act 1928 c. 15
 Betting (Juvenile Messengers) (Scotland) Act 1928 c. 27
 British Guiana Act 1928 c. 5
 Companies Act 1928 c. 45
 Consolidated Fund (No. 1) Act 1928 c. 1
 Cotton Industry Act 1928 c. 11
 Criminal Law Amendment Act 1928 c. 42
 Currency and Bank Notes Act 1928 c. 13
 Dogs (Amendment) Act 1928 c. 21
 Easter Act 1928 c. 35
 Education (Scotland) Act 1928 c. 28
 Educational Endowments (Scotland) Act 1928 c. 30
 Finance Act 1928 c. 17
 Food and Drugs (Adulteration) Act 1928 c. 31
 Industrial and Provident Societies (Amendment) Act 1928 c. 4
 Isle of Man (Customs) Act 1928 c. 38
 Local Authorities (Emergency Provisions) Act 1928 c. 9
 Merchant Shipping (Line-throwing Appliance) Act 1928 c. 40
 Mr. Speaker's Retirement Act 1928 c. 16
 National Health Insurance Act 1928 c. 14
 Naval Prize Act 1928 c. 36
 Northern Ireland (Miscellaneous Provisions) Act 1928 c. 24
 Patents and Designs (Convention) Act 1928 c. 3
 Petroleum (Amendment) Act 1928 c. 20
 Petroleum (Consolidation) Act 1928 c. 32
 Post Office and Telegraph (Money) Act 1928 c. 37
 Protection of Lapwings Act 1928 c. 2
 Racecourse Betting Act 1928 c. 41
 Rag Flock Act (1911) Amendment Act 1928 c. 39
 Rating and Valuation Act 1928 c. 8
 Rating and Valuation (Apportionment) Act 1928 c. 44
 Rating (Scotland) Amendment Act 1928 c. 6
 Reorganisation of Offices (Scotland) Act 1928 c. 34
 Representation of the People (Equal Franchise) Act 1928 c. 12
 Representation of the People (Reading University) Act 1928 c. 25
 Shops (Hours of Closing) Act 1928 c. 33
 Slaughter of Animals (Scotland) Act 1928 c. 29
 Solicitors Act 1928 c. 22
 Straits Settlements and Johore Territorial Waters (Agreement) Act 1928 c. 23
 Teachers (Superannuation) Act 1928 c. 10
 Theatrical Employers Registration (Amendment) Act 1928 c. 46

19 & 20 Geo. 5
 Consolidated Fund (No. 1) Act 1928 (Session 2) c. 2
 Electricity (Supply) Act 1928 c. 4
 Expiring Laws Continuance Act 1928 c. 3
 Public Works Loans Act 1928 c. 5
 Unemployment Insurance Act 1928 c. 1
 Western Highlands and Islands (Transport Services) Act 1928 c. 6

1929

19 & 20 Geo. 5

 Age of Marriage Act 1929 c. 36
 Agricultural Credits (Scotland) Act 1929 c. 13
 Agricultural Rates Act 1929 c. 26
 Appellate Jurisdiction Act 1929 c. 8
 Appropriation Act 1929 c. 22
 Army and Air Force (Annual) Act 1929 c. 20
 Artificial Cream Act 1929 c. 32
 Bastardy (Witness Process) Act 1929 c. 38
 Bridges Act 1929 c. 33
 Chatham and Sheerness Stipendiary Magistrate Act 1929 c. 30
 Companies Act 1929 c. 23
 Consolidated Fund (No. 2) Act 1929 c. 10
 Factory and Workshop (Cotton Cloth Factories) Act 1929 c. 15
 Finance Act 1929 c. 21
 Fire Brigade Pensions Act 1929 c. 35
 Gas Under takings Act 1929 c. 24
 Government Annuities Act 1929 c. 29
 Imperial Telegraphs Act 1929 c. 7
 Industrial Assurance and Friendly Societies Act 1929 c. 28
 Infant Life (Preservation) Act 1929 c. 34
 Law of Property (Amendment) Act 1929 c. 9
 Local Government Act 1929 c. 17
 Local Government (Scotland) Act 1929 c. 25
 Northern Ireland Land Act 1929 c. 14
 Overseas Trade Act 1929 c. 12
 Pensions (Governors of Dominions, &c.) Act 1929 c. 16
 Pharmacy Act 1929 c. 31
 Police Magistrates Superannuation (Amendment) Act 1929 c. 37
 Salmon and Freshwater Fisheries (Amendment) Act 1929 c. 39
 Savings Banks Act 1929 c. 27
 Superannuation (Diplomatic Service) Act 1929 c. 11
 Unemployment Insurance (Northern Ireland Agreement) Act 1929 c. 18
 Unemployment Insurance (Transitional Provisions Amendment) Act 1929 c. 19

20 & 21 Geo. 5

 Colonial Development Act 1929 c. 5
 Consolidated Fund (No. 1) Act 1929 (Session 2) c. 11
 Development (Loan Guarantees and Grants) Act 1929 c. 7
 Expiring Laws Continuance Act 1929 c. 12
 Government of India (Aden) Act 1929 c. 2
 Highlands and Islands (Medical Service) Additional Grant Act 1929 c. 13
 Housing (Revision of Contributions) Act 1929 c. 6
 Irish Free State (Confirmation of Agreement) Act 1929 c. 4
 Isle of Man (Customs) Act 1929 c. 1
 Land Drainage Act 1929 c. 8
 Under Secretaries of State Act 1929 c. 9
 Unemployment Insurance Act 1929 c. 3
 Widows', Orphans' and Old Age Contributory Pensions Act 1929 c. 10

1930 – 1939

1930

20 & 21 Geo. 5

Public General Acts

 Adoption of Children (Scotland) Act 1930 c. 37
 Air Transport (Subsidy Agreements) Act 1930 c. 30
 Appropriation Act 1930 c. 27
 Arbitration (Foreign Awards) Act 1930 c. 15
 Army and Air Force (Annual) Act 1930 c. 22
 British Museum Act 1930 c. 46
 British North America Act 1930 c. 26 (known in Canada as the Constitution Act, 1930)
 Children (Employment Abroad) Act 1930 c. 21
 Coal Mines Act 1930 c. 34
 Consolidated Fund (No. 2) Act 1930 c. 14
 Consolidated Fund (No. 3) Act 1930 c. 18
 Criminal Appeal (Northern Ireland) Act 1930 c. 45
 Education (Scotland) Act 1930 c. 36
 Finance Act 1930 c. 28
 Hairdressers' and Barbers' Shops (Sunday Closing) Act 1930 c. 35
 Housing Act 1930 c. 39
 Housing (Scotland) Act 1930 c. 40
 Illegitimate Children (Scotland) Act 1930 c. 33
 Isle of Man (Customs) Act 1930 c. 42
 Land Drainage Act 1930 c. 44
 Land Drainage (Scotland) Act 1930 c. 20
 London Naval Treaty Act 1930 c. 48
 Mental Treatment Act 1930 c. 23
 Navy and Marines (Wills) Act 1930 c. 38
 Overseas Trade Act 1930 c. 31
 Poor Law Act 1930 c. 17
 Poor Prisoners' Defence Act 1930 c. 32
 Public Works Facilities Act 1930 c. 50
 Public Works Loans Act 1930 c. 49
 Railways (Valuation for Rating) Act 1930 c. 24
 Reservoirs (Safety Provisions) Act 1930 c. 51
 Road Traffic Act 1930 c. 43
 Sea Fisheries Regulation (Expenses) Act 1930 c. 41
 Third Parties (Rights against Insurers) Act 1930 c. 25
 Unemployment Insurance Act 1930 c. 16
 Unemployment Insurance (No. 2) Act 1930 c. 19
 Unemployment Insurance (No. 3) Act 1930 c. 47
 Workmen's Compensation (Silicosis and Asbestosis) Act 1930 c. 29

Private Acts

 Argyll Trust Estate Act 1930 c. 1

21 & 22 Geo. 5

Public General Acts
 Consolidated Fund (No. 1) Act2 1930 (Session 2) c. 1
 Cunard (Insurance) Agreement Act 1930 c. 2
 Expiring Laws Continuance Act 1930 c. 4
 National Health Insurance (Prolongation of Insurance) Act 1930 c. 5
 Unemployment Insurance (No. 4) Act 1930 c. 3

1931

21 & 22 Geo. 5

Public General Acts

 Acquisition of Land (Assessment of Compensation) (Scotland) Act 1931 c. 11
 Adoption of Children (Scotland) Act 1931 c. 37
 Agricultural Land (Utilisation) Act 1931 c. 41
 Agricultural Marketing Act 1931 c. 42
 Agricultural Produce (Grading and Marking) Amendment Act 1931 c. 40
 Ancient Monuments Act 1931 c. 16
 Appropriation Act 1931 c. 29
 Appropriation (No. 2) Act 1931 c. 50
 Architects (Registration) Act, 1931 c. 33
 Army and Air Force (Annual) Act 1931 c. 14
 British Sugar Industry (Assistance) Act 1931 c. 35
 China Indemnity (Application) Act 1931 c. 7
 Coal Mines Act 1931 c. 27
 Colonial Naval Defence Act 1931 c. 9
 Consolidated Fund (No. 2) Act 1931 c. 10
 Finance Act 1931 c. 28
 Finance (No. 2) Act 1931 c. 49
 Foodstuffs (Prevention of Exploitation) Act 1931 c. 51
 Gold Standard (Amendment) Act 1931 c. 46
 House of Commons Disqualification (Declaration of Law) Act 1931 c. 13
 Housing (Rural Authorities) Act 1931 c. 39
 Housing (Rural Workers) Amendment Act 1931 c. 22
 Improvement of Live Stock (Licensing of Bulls) Act 1931 c. 43
 Isle of Man (Customs) Act 1931 c. 34
 Isle of Man Loans Act 1931 c. 38
 Local Authorities (Publicity) Act 1931 c. 17
 Local Government (Clerks) Act 1931 c. 45
 Marriage (Prohibited Degrees of Relationship) Act 1931 c. 31
 Mauritius Loan (Guarantee) Act 1931 c. 26
 Metropolitan Police (Staff Superannuation and Police Fund) Act 1931 c. 12
 Mining Industry (Welfare Fund) Act 1931 c. 23
 National Economy Act 1931 c. 48
 National Health Insurance (Prolongation of Insurance) Act 1931 c. 6
 Palestine and East Africa Loans (Amendment) Act 1931 c. 21
 Post Office and Telegraph (Money) Act 1931 c. 20
 Probation of Offenders (Scotland) Act 1931 c. 30
 Public Works Loans Act 1931 c. 47
 Road Traffic (Amendment) Act 1931 c. 32
 Sentence of Death (Expectant Mothers) Act 1931 c. 24
 Small Landholders and Agricultural Holdings (Scotland) Act 1931 c. 44
 Sunday Performances (Temporary Regulation) Act 1931 c. 52
 Unemployment Insurance Act 1931 c. 8
 Unemployment Insurance (No. 2) Act 1931 c. 25
 Unemployment Insurance (No. 3) Act 1931 c. 36
 Widows', Orphans' and Old Age Contributory Pensions Act 1931 c. 19
 Workmen's Compensation Act 1931 c. 18
 Yarmouth Naval Hospital Act 1931 c. 15

22 & 23 Geo. 5

Public General Acts
 Abnormal Importations (Customs Duties) Act 1931 c. 1
 Educational Endowments (Scotland) Act 1931 c. 5
 Expiring Laws Act 1931 c. 2
 Horticultural Products (Emergency Customs Duties) Act 1931 c. 3
 Indian Pay (Temporary Abatements) Act 1931 c. 7
 National Health Insurance (Prolongation of Insurance) Act 1931 c. 6
 Statute of Westminster 1931 c. 4

1932

22 & 23 Geo. 5

Public General Acts

 Administration of Justice Act 1932 c. 55
 Agricultural Credits Act 1932 c. 35
 Appropriation Act 1932 c. 50
 Army and Air Force (Annual) Act 1932 c. 22
 Bills of Exchange Act (1882) Amendment Act 1932 c. 44
 British Museum Act 1932 c. 34
 Carriage by Air Act 1932 c. 36
 Chancel Repairs Act 1932 c. 20
 Children and Young Persons Act 1932 c. 46
 Children and Young Persons (Scotland) Act 1932 c. 47
 Coal Mines Act 1932 c. 29
 Consolidated Fund (No. 1) Act 1932 c. 14
 Dangerous Drugs Act 1932 c. 15
 Destructive Imported Animals Act 1932 c. 12
 Extradition Act 1932 c. 39
 Finance Act 1932 c. 25
 Financial Emergency Enactments (Continuance) Act 1932 c. 13
 Gas Undertakings Act 1932 c. 40
 Grey Seals Protection Act 1932 c. 23
 Hire Purchase and Small Debt (Scotland) Act 1932 c. 38
 Import Duties Act 1932 c. 8
 Isle of Man (Customs) Act 1932 c. 16
 Isle of Man (Customs) (No. 2) Act 1932 c. 41
 Irish Free State (Special Duties) Act 1932 c. 30
 Law of Property (Entailed Interests) Act 1932 c. 27
 Malta Constitution Act 1932 c. 43
 Marriage (Naval, Military, and Air Force Chapels) Act 1932 c. 31
 Merchant Shipping (Safety and Load Line Conventions) Act 1932 c. 9
 National Health Insurance and Contributory Pensions Act 1932 c. 52
 Northern Ireland (Miscellaneous Provisions) Act 1932 c. 11
 Ottawa Agreements Act 1932 c. 53
 Patents and Designs Act 1932 c. 32
 President of the Board of Trade Act 1932 c. 21
 Public Health (Cleansing of Shell-fish) Act 1932 c. 28
 Public Works Loans Act 1932 c. 42
 Rating and Valuation Act 1932 c. 18
 Rating and Valuation (No. 2) Act 1932 c. 33
 Rights of Way Act 1932 c. 45
 Solicitors Act 1932 c. 37
 Sunday Entertainments Act 1932 c. 51
 Tanganyika and British Honduras Loans Act 1932 c. 17
 Town and Country Planning Act 1932 c. 48
 Town and Country Planning (Scotland) Act 1932 c. 49
 Transitional Payments (Determination of Need) Act 1932 c. 54
 Transitional Payments Prolongation (Unemployed Persons) Act 1932 c. 19
 Universities (Scotland) Act 1932 c. 26
 Veterinary Surgeons (Irish Free State Agreement) Act 1932 c. 10
 Wheat Act 1932 c. 24

23 & 24 Geo. 5

Public General Acts

 Consolidated Fund (No. 1) Act 1932 (Session 2) c. 1
 Expiring Laws Continuance Act 1932 c. 2

1933

23 & 24 Geo. 5

Public General Acts

 Administration of Justice (Miscellaneous Provisions) Act 1933 c. 36
 Administration of Justice (Scotland) Act 1933 c. 41
 Agricultural Marketing Act 1933 c. 31
 Appropriation Act 1933 c. 34
 Army and Air Force (Annual) Act 1933 c. 11
 Assurance Companies (Winding up) Act 1933 c. 9
 Austrian Loan Guarantee Act 1933 c. 5
 Blind Voters Act 1933 c. 27
 British Nationality and Status of Aliens Act 1933 c. 49
 Children and Young Persons Act 1933 c. 12
 Church of Scotland (Property and Endowments) (Amendment) Act 1933 c. 44
 Consolidated Fund (No. 2) Act 1933 c. 3
 Cotton Industry Act 1933 c. 30
 Education (Necessity of Schools) Act 1933 c. 29
 Electricity (Supply) Act 1933 c. 46
 Evidence (Foreign, Dominion and Colonial Documents) Act 1933 c. 4
 Exchange Equalisation Account Act 1933 c. 18
 Expiring Laws Continuance Act 1933 c. 48
 False Oaths (Scotland) Act 1933 c. 20
 Finance Act 1933 c. 19
 Firearms and Imitation Firearms (Criminal Use) Act 1933 c. 50
 Foreign Judgments (Reciprocal Enforcement) Act 1933 c. 13
 Government of India (Amendment) Act 1933 c. 23
 Housing (Financial Provisions) Act 1933 c. 15
 Housing (Financial Provisions) (Scotland) Act 1933 c. 16
 Indian Pay (Temporary Abatements) Act 1933 c. 7
 Isle of Man (Customs) Act 1933 c. 40
 Local Government Act 1933 c. 51
 Local Government and other Officers Superannuation (Temporary Provisions) Act 1933 c. 43
 Local Government (General Exchequer Contributions) Act 1933 c. 8
 London Passenger Transport Act 1933 c. 14
 Metropolitan Police Act 1933 c. 33
 Municipal Corporations (Audit) Act 1933 c. 28
 Pharmacy and Poisons Act 1933 c. 25
 Private Legislation Procedure (Scotland) Act 1933 c. 37
 Protection of Animals (Cruelty to Dogs) Act 1933 c. 17
 Protection of Birds Act 1933 c. 52
 Rent and Mortgage Interest Restrictions (Amendment) Act 1933 c. 32
 Road and Rail Traffic Act 1933 c. 53
 Russian Goods (Import Prohibition) Act 1933 c. 10
 Sea-Fishing Industry Act 1933 c. 45
 Service of Process (Justices) Act 1933 c. 42
 Slaughter of Animals Act 1933 c. 39
 Solicitors Act 1933 c. 24
 Solicitors (Scotland) Act 1933 c. 21
 Summary Jurisdiction (Appeals) Act 1933 c. 38
 Superannuation (Ecclesiastical Commissioners and Queen Anne's Bounty) Act 1933 c. 47
 Teachers (Superannuation) Act 1933 c. 22
 Trout (Scotland) Act 1933 c. 35
 Unemployment Insurance (Expiring Enactments) Act 1933 c. 26
 Visiting Forces (British Commonwealth) Act 1933 c. 6

Local Acts

 Dearne District Traction Act 1933 c. xlvi
Calvinistic Methodist or Presbyterian Church of Wales Act 1933, c. xxxvii

Private Acts

 Grosvenor Estate Act 1933 c. 1

24 & 25 Geo. 5

Public General Acts
 Agricultural Marketing (No. 2) Act 1933 c. 1
 Newfoundland Act 1933 c. 2

1934

24 & 25 Geo. 5

Public General Acts

 Administration of Justice (Appeals) Act 1934 c. 40
 Adoption of Children (Workmen's Compensation) Act 1934 c. 34
 Air Force Reserve (Pilots and Observers) Act 1934 c. 5
 Appropriation Act 1934 c. 44
 Arbitration Act 1934 c. 14
 Architects (Registration) Act, 1934 c. 38
 Army and Air Force (Annual) Act 1934 c. 11
 Assessor of Public Undertakings (Scotland) Act 1934 c. 22
 Betting and Lotteries Act 1934 c. 58
 British Hydrocarbon Oils Production Act 1934 c. 4
 British Sugar (Subsidy) Act 1934 c. 39
 Cattle Industry (Emergency Provisions) Act 1934 c. 54
 Colonial Stock Act 1934 c. 47
 Consolidated Fund (No. 1) Act 1934 c. 3
 Cotton Manufacturing Industry (Temporary Provisions) Act 1934 c. 30
 County Courts Act 1934 c. 53
 County Courts (Amendment) Act 1934 c. 17
 Debts Clearing Offices and Import Restrictions Act 1934 c. 31
 Dindings Agreement (Approval) Act 1934 c. 55
 Dyestuffs (Import Regulation) Act 1934 c. 6
 Expiring Laws Continuance Act 1934 c. 57
 Finance Act 1934 c. 32
 Firearms Act 1934 c. 16
 Gas Undertakings Act 1934 c. 28
 Incitement to Disaffection Act 1934 c. 56
 Illegal Trawling (Scotland) Act 1934 c. 18
 Indian Pay (Temporary Abatements) Act 1934 c. 8
 Isle of Man (Customs) Act 1934 c. 46
 Land Settlement (Scotland) Act 1934 c. 35
 Law Reform (Miscellaneous Provisions) Act 1934 c. 41
 Licensing (Permitted Hours) Act 1934 c. 26
 Marriage (Extension of Hours) Act 1934 c. 13
 Milk Act 1934 c. 51
 Mines (Working Facilities) Act 1934 c. 27
 Mining Industry (Welfare Fund) Act 1934 c. 9
 National Maritime Museum Act 1934 c. 43
 North Atlantic Shipping Act 1934 c. 10
 Overseas Trade Act 1934 c. 12
 Palestine Loan Act 1934 c. 33
 Petroleum (Production) Act 1934 c. 36
 Poor Law Act 1934 c. 59
 Poor Law (Scotland) Act 1934 c. 52
 Protection of Animals Act 1934 c. 21
 Protection of Animals (Cruelty to Dogs) (Scotland) Act 1934 c. 25
 Public Works Loans Act 1934 c. 48
 Registration of Births, Deaths, and Marriages (Scotland) (Amendment) Act 1934 c. 19
 Road Traffic Act 1934 c. 50
 Rural Water Supplies Act 1934 c. 7
 Shops Act 1934 c. 42
 Solicitors Act 1934 c. 45
 Statutory Salaries (Restoration) Act 1934 c. 24
 Supply of Water in Bulk Act 1934 c. 15
 Trustee Savings Banks (Special Investments) Act 1934 c. 37
 Unemployment Act 1934 c. 29
 Water Supplies (Exceptional Shortage Orders) Act 1934 c. 20
 Whaling Industry (Regulation) Act 1934 c. 49
 Workmen's Compensation (Coal Mines) Act 1934 c. 23

25 & 26 Geo. 5

Public General Acts
 Special Areas (Development and Improvement) Act 1934 c. 1

1935

25 & 26 Geo. 5

Public General Acts

 Appropriation Act 1935 c. 28
 Army and Air Force (Annual) Act 1935 c. 17
 Assurance Companies (Winding up) Act 1935 c. 45
 British Shipping (Assistance) Act 1935 c. 7
 British Sugar (Subsidy) Act 1935 c. 37
 Cattle Industry (Emergency Provisions) Act 1935 c. 12
 Cattle Industry (Emergency Provisions) (No. 2) Act 1935 c. 39
 Consolidated Fund (No. 1) Act 1935 c. 4
 Consolidated Fund (No. 2) Act 1935 c. 10
 Counterfeit Currency (Convention) Act 1935 c. 25
 Criminal Lunatics (Scotland) Act 1935 c. 32
 Defence (Barracks) Act 1935 c. 26
 Diseases of Animals Act 1935 c. 31
 Educational Endowments (Scotland) Act 1935 c. 5
 Electricity (Supply) Act 1935 c. 3
 Finance Act 1935 c. 24
 Government of India Act 1935 c. 42 - retroactively re-enacted by the Government of India (Reprinting) Act 1935 as the Government of India Act 1935 [26 Geo. 5 & 1 Edw. 8 c. 2] and the Government of Burma Act 1935 [26 Geo. 5 & 1 Edw. 8 c. 3]
 Herring Industry Act 1935 c. 9
 House of Commons Disqualification (Declaration of Law) Act 1935 c. 38
 Housing Act 1935 c. 40
 Housing (Scotland) Act 1935 c. 41
 Increase of Rent and Mortgage Interest (Restrictions) Act 1935 c. 13
 Isle of Man (Customs) Act 1935 c. 34
 Land Drainage (Scotland) Act 1935 c. 19
 Law Reform (Married Women and Tort-feasors) Act 1935 c. 30
 London Passenger Transport (Agreement) Act 1935 c. 27
 Metropolitan Police (Borrowing Powers) Act 1935 c. 16
 Money Payments (Justices Procedure) Act 1935 c. 46
 National Gallery (Overseas Loans) Act 1935 c. 18
 National Health Insurance and Contributory Pensions Act 1935 c. 44
 Northern Ireland Land Purchase (Winding Up) Act 1935 c. 21
 Post Office (Amendment) Act 1935 c. 15
 Post Office and Telegraph (Money) Act 1935 c. 14
 Public Health (Water and Sewerage) (Scotland) Act 1935 c. 36
 Regimental Charitable Funds Act 1935 c. 11
 Restriction of Ribbon Development Act 1935 c. 47
 Salmon and Freshwater Fisheries Act 1935 c. 43
 Superannuation Act 1935 c. 23
 Supreme Court of Judicature (Amendment) Act 1935 c. 2
 Teachers (Superannuation) Act 1935 c. 35
 Unemployment Assistance (Temporary Provisions) Act 1935 c. 6
 Unemployment Assistance (Temporary Provisions) (No. 2) Act 1935 c. 22
 Unemployment Insurance Act 1935 c. 8
 Unemployment Insurance (Crediting of Contributions) Act 1935 c. 33
 University of Durham Act 1935 c. 29
 Vagrancy Act 1935 c. 20

26 Geo. 5 & 1 Edw. 8

Public General Acts
 Expiring Laws Continuance Act 1935 c. 4
 Government of Burma Act 1935 c. 3 - retroactive re-enactment by the Government of India (Reprinting) Act 1935 of part of the Government of India Act 1935 [25 & 26 Geo. 5 c. 42]
 Government of India Act 1935 c. 2 - retroactive re-enactment by the Government of India (Reprinting) Act 1935 of part of the Government of India Act 1935 [25 & 26 Geo. 5 c. 42]
 Government of India (Reprinting) Act 1935 c. 1
 Public Works Loans Act 1935 c. 5
 Railways (Agreement) Act 1935 c. 6

Local Acts
Bridge of Allan Gas Order Confirmation Act 1935
National Trust for Scotland Order Confirmation Act 1935
Rothesay Corporation Gas Order Confirmation Act 1935
Campbeltown Harbour, Water and Gas Order Confirmation Act 1935
Dundee Corporation Order Confirmation Act 1935

1936

26 Geo. 5 & 1 Edw. 8

Public General Acts
 Air Navigation Act 1936 c. 44
 Appropriation Act 1936 c. 37
 Army and Air Force (Annual) Act 1936 c. 14
 British Shipping (Continuance of Subsidy) Act 1936 c. 12
 Cattle Industry (Emergency Provisions) Act 1936 c. 46
 Civil List Act 1936 c. 15
 Coinage Offences Act 1936 c. 16
 Consolidated Fund (No. 1) Act 1936 c. 8
 Consolidated Fund (No. 2) Act 1936 c. 11
 Cotton Spinning Industry Act 1936 c. 21
 Crown Lands Act 1936 c. 47
 Education Act 1936 c. 41
 Education (Scotland) Act 1936 c. 42
 Electricity Supply (Meters) Act 1936 c. 20
 Employment of Women and Young Persons Act 1936 c. 24
 Finance Act 1936 c. 34
 Firearms (Amendment) Act 1936 c. 39
 Health Resorts and Watering Places Act 1936 c. 48
 Hours of Employment (Conventions) Act 1936 c. 22
 Housing Act 1936 c. 51
 Isle of Man (Customs) Act 1936 c. 45
 Land Registration Act 1936 c. 26
 Malta (Letters Patent) Act 1936 c. 29
 Midwives Act 1936 c. 40
 Milk (Extension of Temporary Provisions) Act 1936 c. 9
 National Health Insurance Act 1936 c. 32
 Old Age Pensions Act 1936 c. 31
 Pensions (Governors of Dominions, &c.) Act 1936 c. 25
 Petroleum (Transfer of Licences) Act 1936 c. 27
 Pilotage Authorities (Limitation of Liability) Act 1936 c. 36
 Private Legislation Procedure (Scotland) Act 1936 c. 52
 Public Health Act 1936 c. 49
 Public Health (London) Act 1936 c. 50
 Retail Meat Dealers' Shops (Sunday Closing) Act 1936 c. 30
 Road Traffic (Driving Licences) Act 1936 c. 23
 Shops Act 1936 c. 28
 Shops (Sunday Trading Restriction) Act 1936 c. 53
 Solicitors Act 1936 c. 35
 Special Areas Reconstruction (Agreement) Act 1936 c. 19
 Sugar Industry (Reorganisation) Act 1936 c. 18
 Tithe Act 1936 c. 43
 Unemployment Assistance (Temporary Provisions) (Extension) Act 1936 c. 7
 Unemployment Insurance (Agriculture) Act 1936 c. 13
 Unemployment (Northern Ireland Agreement) Act 1936 c. 10
 Voluntary Hospitals (Paying Patients) Act 1936 c. 17
 Weights and Measures Act 1936 c. 38
 Weights and Measures, Sale of Coal (Scotland) Act 1936 c. 54
 Widows', Orphans' and Old Age Contributory Pensions Act 1936 c. 33

1 Edw. 8 & 1 Geo. 6

Public General Acts

 Expiring Laws Continuance Act 1936 c. 4
 His Majesty's Declaration of Abdication Act 1936 c. 3
 Merchant Shipping (Carriage of Munitions to Spain) Act 1936 c. 1
 Public Order Act 1936 c. 6
 Railway Freight Rebates Act 1936 c. 2
 Trunk Roads Act 1936 c.5

1937

1 Edw. 8 & 1 Geo. 6

Public General Acts

 Agricultural Wages (Regulation) (Scotland) Act 1937 c. 53
 Agriculture Act 1937 c. 70
 Appropriation Act 1937 c. 55
 Army and Air Force (Annual) Act 1937 c. 26
 Beef and Veal Customs Duties Act 1937 c. 8
 British Shipping (Continuance of Subsidy) Act 1937 c. 21
 Chairmen of Traffic Commissioners, &c. (Tenure of Office) Act 1937 c. 52
 Children and Young Persons (Scotland) Act 1937 c. 37
 Cinematograph Films (Animals) Act 1937 c. 59
 Civil List Act 1937 c. 32
 Coal Mines (Employment of Boys) Act 1937 c. 62
 Coal (Registration of Ownership) Act 1937 c. 56
 Consolidated Fund (No. 1) Act 1937 c. 7
 Consolidated Fund (No. 2) Act 1937 c. 20
 County Councils Association Expenses (Amendment) Act 1937 c. 27
 Defence Loans Act 1937 c. 13
 Diseases of Fish Act 1937 c. 33
 East India Loans Act 1937 c. 14
 Education (Deaf Children) Act 1937 c. 25
 Empire Settlement Act 1937 c. 18
 Exchange Equalisation Account Act 1937 c. 41
 Export Guarantees Act 1937 c. 61
 Exportation of Horses Act 1937 c. 42
 Factories Act 1937 c. 67
 Finance Act 1937 c. 54
 Firearms Act 1937 c. 12
 Geneva Convention Act 1937 c. 15
 Harbours, Piers and Ferries (Scotland) Act 1937 c. 28
 Hydrogen Cyanide (Fumigation) Act 1937 c. 45
 India and Burma (Existing Laws) Act 1937 c. 9
 Isle of Man (Customs) Act 1937 c. 64
 Livestock Industry Act 1937 c. 50
 Local Government (Financial Provisions) Act 1937 c. 22
 Local Government (Financial Provisions) (Scotland) Act 1937 c. 29
 Local Government (Members' Travelling Expenses) Act 1937 c. 36
 Local Government Superannuation Act 1937 c. 68
 Local Government Superannuation (Scotland) Act 1937 c. 69
 London Naval Treaty Act 1937 c. 65
 Maternity Services (Scotland) Act 1937 c. 30
 Matrimonial Causes Act 1937 c. 57
 Merchant Shipping Act 1937 c. 23
 Merchant Shipping (Spanish Frontiers Observation) Act 1937 c. 19
 Methylated Spirits (Sale by Retail) (Scotland) Act 1937 c. 48
 Milk (Amendment) Act 1937 c. 66
 Ministers of the Crown Act 1937 c. 38
 National Health Insurance Act (Amendment) Act 1937 c. 24
 Nigeria (Remission of Payments) Act 1937 c. 63
 Physical Training and Recreation Act 1937 c. 46
 Post Office and Telegraph (Money) Act 1937 c. 51
 Public Health (Drainage of Trade Premises) Act 1937 c. 40
 Public Records (Scotland) Act 1937 c. 43
 Public Works Loans Act 1937 c. 11
 Rating and Valuation Act 1937 c. 60
 Regency Act 1937 c. 16
 Reserve Forces Act 1937 c. 17
 Road Traffic Act 1937 c. 44
 Sheep Stocks Valuation (Scotland) Act 1937 c. 34
 Special Areas (Amendment) Act 1937 c. 31
 Statutory Salaries Act 1937 c. 35
 Summary Procedure (Domestic Proceedings) Act 1937 c. 58
 Teachers (Superannuation) Act 1937 c. 47
 Trade Marks (Amendment) Act 1937 c. 49
 Unemployment Assistance (Temporary Provisions) (Amendment) Act 1937 c. 10
 Widows', Orphans' and Old Age Contributory Pensions (Voluntary Contributors) Act 1937 c. 39

1 & 2 Geo. 6

Public General Acts
 Air-Raid Precautions Act 1937 c. 6
 Expiring Laws Continuance Act 1937 c. 1
 Merchant Shipping (Superannuation Contributions) Act 1937 c. 4
 National Health Insurance (Juvenile Contributors and Young Persons) Act 1937 c. 3
 Public Works Loans (No. 2) Act 1937 c. 7
 Quail Protection Act 1937 c. 5
 Supreme Court of Judicature (Amendment) Act 1937 c. 2

1938

1 & 2 Geo. 6

Public General Acts

 Administration of Justice (Miscellaneous Provisions) Act 1938 c. 63
 Air Navigation (Financial Provisions) Act 1938 c. 33
 Anglo-Turkish (Armaments Credit) Agreement Act 1938 c. 60
 Appropriation Act 1938 c. 47
 Architects (Registration) Act, 1938 c. 54
 Army and Air Force (Annual) Act 1938 c. 20
 Bacon Industry Act 1938 c. 71
 Baking Industry (Hours of Work) Act 1938 c. 41
 Blind Persons Act 1938 c. 11
 British Museum Act 1938 c. 62
 Children and Young Persons Act 1938 c. 40
 Chimney Sweepers Acts (Repeal) Act 1938 c. 58
 Cinematograph Films Act 1938 c. 17
 Coal Act 1938 c. 52
 Consolidated Fund (No. 1) Act 1938 c. 9
 Conveyancing Amendment (Scotland) Act 1938 c. 24
 Cotton Industry Act 1938 c. 15
 Criminal Procedure (Scotland) Act 1938 c. 48
 Divorce (Scotland) Act 1938 c. 50
 Dogs Amendment Act 1938 c. 21
 Dominica Act 1938 c. 10
 Eire (Confirmation of Agreements) Act 1938 c. 25
 Essential Commodities Reserves Act 1938 c. 51
 Evidence Act 1938 c. 28
 Finance Act 1938 c. 46
 Fire Brigades Act 1938 c. 72
 Food and Drugs Act 1938 c. 56
 Herring Industry Act 1938 c. 42
 Hire-Purchase Act 1938 c. 53
 Holidays with Pay Act 1938 c. 70
 Housing (Agricultural Population) (Scotland) Act 1938 c. 38
 Housing (Financial Provisions) Act 1938 c. 16
 Housing (Rural Workers) Amendment Act 1938 c. 35
 Imperial Telegraphs Act 1938 c. 57
 Increase of Rent and Mortgage Interest (Restrictions) Act 1938 c. 26
 Infanticide Act 1938 c. 36
 Inheritance (Family Provision) Act 1938 c. 45
 Isle of Man (Customs) Act 1938 c. 68
 Land Tax Commissioners Act 1938 c. 18
 Leasehold Property (Repairs) Act 1938 c. 34
 Local Government (Hours of Poll) Act 1938 c. 59
 Mental Deficiency Act 1938 c. 43
 Milk (Extension and Amendment) Act 1938 c. 61
 National Health Insurance (Amendment) Act 1938 c. 14
 Naval Discipline (Amendment) Act 1938 c. 64
 Nursing Homes Registration (Scotland) Act 1938 c. 73
 Patents &c. (International Conventions) Act 1938 c. 29
 Poor Law (Amendment) Act 1938 c. 23
 Population (Statistics) Act 1938 c. 12
 Prevention and Treatment of Blindness (Scotland) Act 1938 c. 32
 Rating and Valuation (Air-Raid Works) Act 1938 c. 65
 Rating and Valuation (Air Raid Works) (Scotland) Act 1938 c. 66
 Rating and Valuation (Postponement of Valuations) Act 1938 c. 19
 Registration of Births, Deaths, and Marriages (Scotland) Act 1938 c. 55
 Registration of Still-Births (Scotland) Act 1938 c. 55
 Road Haulage Wages Act 1938 c. 44
 Scottish Land Court Act 1938 c. 31
 Sea Fish Industry Act 1938 c. 30
 Street Playgrounds Act 1938 c. 37
 Superannuation (Various Services) Act 1938 c. 13
 Supreme Court of Judicature (Amendment) Act 1938 c. 67
 Trade Marks Act 1938 c. 22
 Unemployment Insurance Act 1938 c. 8
 War Department Property Act 1938 c. 49
 Welsh Church (Amendment) Act 1938 c. 39
 Workmen's Compensation (Amendment) Act 1938 c. 27
 Young Persons (Employment) Act 1938 c. 69

Private Acts

 Tatton Estate Act 1938 c. 1

2 & 3 Geo. 6

Public General Acts

 Expiring Laws Continuance Act 1938 c. 1
 Housing (Financial Provisions) (Scotland) Act 1938 c. 3
 Public Works Loans Act 1938 c. 2

1939

2 & 3 Geo. 6

Public General Acts

 Access to Mountains Act 1939 c. 30
 Administration of Justice (Emergency Provisions) Act 1939 c. 78
 Administration of Justice (Emergency Provisions) (Northern Ireland) Act 1939 c. 105
 Administration of Justice (Emergency Provisions) (Scotland) Act 1939 c. 79
 Adoption of Children (Regulation) Act 1939 c. 27
 Agricultural Development Act 1939 c. 48
 Air Ministry (Heston and Kenley Aerodromes Extension) Act c. 59
 Appropriation Act 1939 c. 52
 Appropriation (No. 2) Act 1939 c. 63
 Armed Forces (Conditions of Service) Act 1939 c. 68
 Army and Air Force (Annual) Act 1939 c. 17
 Bacon Industry (Amendment) Act 1939 c. 10
 British Overseas Airways Act 1939 c. 61
 Building Societies Act 1939 c. 55
 Camps Act 1939 c. 22
 Cancer Act 1939 c. 13
 Census of Production Act 1939 c. 15
 Charities (Fuel Allotments) Act 1939 c. 26
 Chartered and Other Bodies (Temporary Provisions) Act 1939 c. 119
 Civil Defence Act 1939 c. 31
 China (Currency Stabilisation) Act 1939 c. 14
 Coast Protection Act 1939 c. 39
 Compensation (Defence) Act 1939 c. 75
 Consolidated Fund (No. 1) Act 1939 c. 12
 Control of Employment Act 1939 c. 104
 Cotton Industry (Reorganisation) Act 1939 c. 54
 Cotton Industry (Reorganisation) (Postponement) Act 1939 c. 116
 Courts (Emergency Powers) Act 1939 c. 67
 Courts (Emergency Powers) (Scotland) Act c. 113
 Currency (Defence) Act 1939 c. 64
 Currency and Bank Notes Act 1939 c. 7
 Custody of Children (Scotland) Act 1939 c. 4
 Czecho-Slovakia (Financial Assistance) Act 1939 c. 6
 Czecho-Slovakia (Restrictions on Banking Accounts, &c.) Act 1939 c. 11
 Defence Loans Act 1939 c. 8
 Education (Emergency) Act 1939 c. 111
 Education (Emergency) (Scotland) Act 1939 c. 112
 Education (Scotland) (War Service Superannuation) Act 1939 c. 96
 Emergency Powers (Defence) Act 1939 c. 62
 Essential Buildings and Plant (Repair of War Damage) Act 1939 c. 74
 Exchequer and Audit Departments (Temporary Provisions) Act 1939 c. 101
 Execution of Trusts (Emergency Provisions) Act 1939 c. 114
 Export Guarantees Act 1939 c. 5
 Finance Act 1939 c. 41
 Finance (No. 2) Act 1939 c. 109
 Government and other Stocks (Emergency Provisions) Act 1939 c. 100
 Government of India Act (Amendment) Act 1939 c. 66
 Hall-marking of Foreign Plate Act 1939 c. 36
 House of Commons Members' Fund Act 1939 c. 49
 House of Commons (Service in His Majesty's Forces) Act 1939 c. 85
 House to House Collections Act 1939 c. 44
 Housing (Emergency Powers) Act 1939 c. 73
 Import, Export and Customs Powers (Defence) Act 1939 c. 69
 Import Duties (Emergency Provisions) Act 1939 c. 97
 Income Tax Procedure (Emergency Provisions) Act 1939 c. 99
 Isle of Man (Customs) Act 1939 c. 53
 Isle of Man (War Legislation) Act 1939 c. 86
 Landlord and Tenant (War Damage) Act 1939 c. 72
 Liability for War Damage (Miscellaneous Provisions) Act 1939 c. 102
 Limitation Act 1939 c. 21
 Local Elections and Register of Electors (Temporary Provisions) Act 1939 c. 115
 Local Government Amendment (Scotland) Act 1939 c. 28
 Local Government Staffs (War Service) Act 1939 c. 94
 Local Government Superannuation Act 1939 c. 18
 London Government Act 1939 c. 40
 Marriage Act 1939 c. 33
 Marriage (Scotland) Act 1939 c. 34
 Marriages Validity Act 1939 c. 35
 Military and Air Forces (Prolongation of Service) Act 1939 c. 90
 Military Training Act 1939 c. 25
 Milk Industry Act 1939 c. 46
 Mining Industry (Amendment) Act 1939 c. 45
 Mining Industry (Welfare Fund) Act 1939 c. 9
 Ministers of the Crown (Emergency Appointments) Act 1939 c. 77
 Ministry of Supply Act 1939 c. 38
 National Health Insurance and Contributory Pensions (Emergency Provisions) Act 1939 c. 84
 National Loans Act 1939 c. 117
 National Registration Act 1939 c. 91
 National Service (Armed Forces) Act 1939 c. 81
 Navy and Marines (Wills) Act 1939 c. 87
 Official Secrets Act 1939 c. 121
 Overseas Trade Guarantees Act 1939 c. 47
 Patents and Designs (Limits of Time) Act 1939 c. 32
 Patents, Designs, Copyright and Trade Marks (Emergency) Act 1939 c. 107
 Pensions (Navy, Army, Air Force and Mercantile Marine) Act 1939 c. 83
 Personal Injuries (Emergency Provisions) Act 1939 c. 82
 Police and Firemen (War Service) Act 1939 c. 103
 Possession of Mortgaged Land (Emergency Provisions) Act 1939 c. 108
 Post Office & Telegraph (Money) Act 1939 c. 42
 Prevention of Damage by Rabbits Act 1939 c. 43
 Prevention of Fraud (Investments) Act 1939 c. 16
 Prevention of Violence (Temporary Provisions) Act 1939 c. 50
 Prices of Goods Act 1939 c. 118
 Prize Act 1939 c. 65
 Public Health (Coal Mine Refuse) Act 1939 c. 58
 Public Health (Coal Mine Refuse) (Scotland) Act 1939 c. 23
 Public Trustee (General Deposit Fund) Act 1939 c. 51
 Regional Commissioners Act 1939 c. 76
 Rent and Mortgage Interest Restrictions Act 1939 c. 71
 Reorganisation of Offices (Scotland) Act 1939 c. 20
 Reserve and Auxiliary Forces Act 1939 c. 24
 Restriction of Advertisement (War Risks Insurance) Act 1939 c. 120
 Riding Establishments Act 1939 c. 56
 Royal Marines Act 1939 c. 88
 Senior Public Elementary Schools (Liverpool) Act 1939 c. 60
 Sheriff Courts (Scotland) Act 1939 c. 98
 Ships and Aircraft (Transfer Restriction) Act 1939 c. 70
 Solicitors (Disciplinary Committee) Act 1939 c. 110
 Teachers Superannuation (War Service) Act 1939 c. 95
 Trading with the Enemy Act 1939 c. 89
 Unemployment Assistance (Emergency Powers) Act 1939 c. 93
 Unemployment Insurance Act 1939 c. 29
 Unemployment Insurance (Emergency Powers) Act 1939 c. 92
 Universities and Colleges (Emergency Provisions) Act 1939 c. 106
 War Damage to Land (Scotland) Act 1939 c. 80
 War Risks Insurance Act 1939 c. 57
 Wheat (Amendment) Act 1939 c. 37
 Wild Birds (Duck and Geese) Protection Act 1939 c. 19

Local Acts

 Aberdeen Harbour (Superannuation) Order Confirmation Act 1939 c. xc
 All Hallows Lombard Street Act 1939 c. xvii
 Baird Trust Order Confirmation Act 1939 c. cv
 Bognor and District Gas and Electricity Act 1939 c. lv
 Bootle Corporation Act 1939 c. lxxxv
 Bristol Waterworks Act 1939 c. lxxxi
 City of London (Various Powers) Act 1939 c. xxi
 Colne Valley Water Act 1939 c. lxxviii
 Conway Gas Act 1939 c. xvi
 Coventry Corporation Act 1939 c. lxxxviii
 Croydon Corporation Act 1939 c. clviii
 Droitwich Canals (Abandonment) Act 1939 c. clx
 Dumbartonshire County Council (Kirkintilloch Street Improvement) Order Confirmation Act 1939 c. xci
 Dundee Corporation Order Confirmation Act 1939 c. xxxii
 Dundee Harbour and Tay Ferries (Superannuation) Order Confirmation Act 1939 c. xxxiii
 Exeter Extension Act 1939 c. xv
 Falmouth Docks Acts 1939 c. lxxx
 Folkestone Water Act 1939 c. cii
 Gosport Corporation Act 1939 c. xxiv
 Hamilton Burgh Order Confirmation Act 1939 c. civ
 Jarrow Corporation Act 1939 c. lxiii
 Kirkcaldy Corporation Order Confirmation Act 1939 c. vi
 Lanarkshire County Council Order Confirmation Act 1939 c. xcii
 London and North Eastern Railway (Superannuation Fund) Act 1939 c. xxii
 London Building Acts (Amendment) Act 1939 c. xcvii
 London County Council (General Powers) Act 1939 c. c
 London County Council (Improvements) Act 1939 c. ci
 London County Council (Money) Act 1939 c. clvi
 London Gas Undertakings (Regulations) Act 1939 c. xcix
 London Midland and Scottish Railway Act 1939 c.xxviii
 London Passenger Transport Act 1939 c. lxxxix
 Macclesfield Corporation Act 1939 c. lxxxvii
 Maryport Harbour Act 1939 c. xii
 Medway Conservancy Act 1939 c. lxxxiv
 Merthyr Tydfil Corporation Act 1939 c. lxi
 Methodist Church Act 1939 c. xxvi
 Metropolitan Water Board Act 1939 c. xcvi
 Milford Haven and Tenby Water Act 1939 c. lxviii
 Ministry of Health Provisional Order Confirmation (Bacup) Act 1939 c. lxxiii
 Ministry of Health Provisional Order Confirmation (Bethesda) Act 1939 c. xciv
 Ministry of Health Provisional Order Confirmation (Blackburn) Act 1939 c. viii
 Ministry of Health Provisional Order Confirmation (Bradford) Act 1939 c. xcv
 Ministry of Health Provisional Order Confirmation (Burnham and District Water) Act 1939 c. xliii
 Ministry of Health Provisional Order Confirmation (Colchester) Act 1939 c. xiii
 Ministry of Health Provisional Order Confirmation (Congleton) Act 1939 c. xxxiv
 Ministry of Health Provisional Order Confirmation (Corsham Water) Act 1939 c. xlii
 Ministry of Health Provisional Order Confirmation (Eastern Valleys (Monmouthshire) Joint Sewerage District) Act 1939 c. lxxvi
 Ministry of Health Provisional Order Confirmation (Falmouth) Act 1939 c. lxxiv
 Ministry of Health Provisional Order Confirmation (Hailsham Water) Act 1939 c. xxxvii
 Ministry of Health Provisional Order Confirmation (Hastings) Act 1939 c. ix
 Ministry of Health Provisional Order Confirmation (Hemel Hempstead) Act 1939 c. lxxv
 Ministry of Health Provisional Order Confirmation (Heywood and Middleton Water Board) Act 1939 c. xlvi
 Ministry of Health Provisional Order Confirmation (Leyton) Act 1939 c. x
 Ministry of Health Provisional Order Confirmation (Luton Extension) Act 1939 c. xi
 Ministry of Health Provisional Order Confirmation (Luton Water) Act 1939 c. xxxviii
 Ministry of Health Provisional Order Confirmation (Margate) Act 1939 c. xxxv
 Ministry of Health Provisional Order Confirmation (Matlock) Act 1939 c. xxxvi
 Ministry of Health Provisional Order Confirmation (Newbury) Act 1939 c. xiv
 Ministry of Health Provisional Order Confirmation (Newhaven and Seaford Water) Act 1939 c. xli
 Ministry of Health Provisional Order Confirmation (North Lindsey Water Board) Act 1939 c. lxxi
 Ministry of Health Provisional Order Confirmation (Oxford) Act 1939 c. xlvii
 Ministry of Health Provisional Order Confirmation (Slough) Act 1939 c. xliv
 Ministry of Health Provisional Order Confirmation (South Kent Water) Act 1939 c. xxxix
 Ministry of Health Provisional Order Confirmation (South Staffordshire Joint Hospital District) Act 1939 c. vii
 Ministry of Health Provisional Order Confirmation (Swaffham Water) Act 1939 c. xlv
 Ministry of Health Provisional Order Confirmation (Wembley) Act 1939 c. lxxii
 Ministry of Health Provisional Order Confirmation (York Water) Act 1939 c. xl
 Motherwell and Wishaw Electricity &c. Order Confirmation Act 1939 c. xciii
 Mumbles Pier Act 1939 c. xx
 National Trust Act 1939 c. lxxxvi
 Newquay and District Water Act 1939 c. lxxvii
 North West Midlands Joint Electricity Authority Order Confirmation Act 1939 c. lii
 Northmet Power Act 1939 c. xviii
 Oswestry Corporation Act 1939 c. liii
 Port Glasgow Burgh and Harbour Order Confirmation Act 1939 c. lxix
 Royal Wanstead School Act 1939 c. xxix
 Saint Nicholas Millbrook (Southampton) Church (Sale) Act 1939 c. xxv
 Saint Peter's Chapel Stockport Act 1939 c. lix
 Scottish Union and National Insurance Company's Act 1939 c. xxx
 Sea Fisheries (Tollesbury and West Mersea) Order Confirmation Act 1939 c. li
 Sheffield Corporation Act 1939 c. ciii
 Smethwick Oldbury Rowley Regis and Tipton Transport Act 1939 c. xxxi
 South Shields Corporation (Trolley Vehicles) Order Confirmation Act 1939 c. xlviii
 South Staffordshire Waterworks Act 1939 c. lxii
 Southend-on-Sea Corporation (Trolley Vehicles) Order Confirmation Act 1939 c. cl
 Southern Railway Act 1939 c. lvii
 Southampton Harbour Act 1939 c. lxxxiii
 St. Helens Corporation (Trolley Vehicles) Order Confirmation Act 1939 c. xlix
 Stalybridge Hyde Mossley and Dukinfield Transport and Electricity Board Act 1939 c. lxiv
 Stirling Burgh Order Confirmation Act 1939 c. lxx
 Stroud District Water Board &c. Act 1939 c. lxvii
 Sunderland Corporation Act 1939 c. lxvi
 The King Edward the Seventh Welsh National Memorial Association Act 1939 c. xxvii
 Tiverton Corporation Act 1939 c. lxv
 Tynemouth Corporation Act 1939 c. liv
 Walsall Corporation Act 1939 c. lxxxii
 Wear Navigation and Sunderland Dock Act 1939 c. xix
 West Gloucestershire Water Act 1939 c. xcviii
 West Surrey Water Act 1939 c. lxxix
 Willenhall Urban District Council Act 1939 c. xxiii

3 & 4 Geo. 6

Public General Acts
 Expiring Laws Continuance Act 1939 c. 1
 Postponement of Enactments (Miscellaneous Provisions) Act 1939 c. 2

See also
List of Acts of the Parliament of the United Kingdom

References

1920
1920s in the United Kingdom
1930s in the United Kingdom